Tic-tac do Meu Coração (English: The Tick Tock of My Heart) is a song written by Alcyr Pires Red and Walfrido Silva and recorded by Carmen Miranda in 1935.

Carmen recorded this song accompanied by the flute of Benedito Lacerda and his music group in the 1930s. Was also presented by Miranda in Springtime in the Rockies (1942). It was such a success that it is still remembered  in popular music circles today, and has been revived by singers such as Ney Matogrosso, in the 1980s.

References

External links
Gravações brasileiras de Carmen Miranda

Carmen Miranda songs
1935 songs
Portuguese-language songs
Brazilian songs